Bodo People's Progressive Front (BPPF) is a political party in Assam, India, formed on 12 April 2005 for 
participation in the Bodoland Territorial Areas District elections.

Split
The party suffered a vertical split into BPPF(R) with Rabiram Narzary  and BPPF(H) with Hagrama Mohilary, the then supremo of the dissolved Bodo Liberation Tigers Force  as the Party President respectively.

BPPF(H)
The Hagrama faction aligned with the Indian National Congress in the April 2006 elections for the Assam Assembly and won 11 seats.  It became the junior partner in the Assam government.  This was a historical occasion since the Bodo's, long associated with the Bodoland statehood movement, are now sharing power in Dispur, the capital of Assam.

BPPF(R)
The Rabiram faction, aligned with the Asom Gana Parishad in the April 2006 elections, did not win any seats in the Assam Assembly.

See also
 Bodoland People's Front

References

Defunct political parties in Assam
Bodo nationalism
Political parties established in 2005
2005 establishments in Assam
Year of disestablishment missing